The Taça Campeonato Estadual FPF, was a competition along the same lines as the APEA Taça Competência. Held by the Federação Paulista de Foot-Ball (FPF), an entity that organized two editions of the Campeonato Paulista (1933 and 1934), put the 1934 Campeonato Paulista champion and the Countryside Champion to face each other in two matches.

Participants

Matches

Champion

See also

Taça Competência

References  

1934 in Brazilian football
Defunct football competitions in Brazil